Popke Oosterhof (born 3 August 1947) is a retired Dutch cyclist who won a bronze medal in the team time trial at the 1970 UCI Road World Championships. 

In 1969 he won five stages of the Milk Race and finished second overall; he also finished second in the Belgian Grand Prix. The following year, he won the Ronde van Drenthe, Belgian Grand Prix (with Fedor den Hertog and Tino Tabak) and two stages of the Olympia's Tour. 

After winning one stage of the Milk Race in 1971 he retired from cycling.

References

1947 births
Living people
Dutch male cyclists
People from Assen
UCI Road World Championships cyclists for the Netherlands
Cyclists from Drenthe